Beornwulf (died 826) was King of Mercia (roughly the Midlands of England) from 823 to 826. His short reign saw the collapse of Mercia's supremacy over the other kingdoms of the Anglo-Saxon Heptarchy.

Biography
A man named Beornwulf is mentioned as having witnessed a charter of King Coenwulf in 812 and another of King Ceolwulf in 823, but his position on each of these charters suggests that he was not of an exceptionally high rank. Beornwulf deposed Ceolwulf I in 823.

In 825 Beornwulf marched against the West Saxons. Beornwulf's army met them at Ellandun (now Wroughton near Swindon in Wiltshire). The battle ended in a disastrous defeat for the Mercians, and is seen by historians as the end of the so-called Mercian Supremacy. In 826 Ecgberht's son Æthelwulf invaded Kent and drove out its pro-Mercian king, Baldred.

In the wake of these events, Mercia's dominance in southern England rapidly unravelled. Essex and Sussex switched their loyalty to Ecgberht; and the East Anglians asked for Ecgberht's protection against the Mercians in the same year. Beornwulf was killed by the East Anglians in battle while attempting to put down a rebellion.

Beornwulf rebuilt the Abbey of St. Peter (later Gloucester Cathedral) and he presided over two synods at Clofesho (an unknown location believed to be near London with Archbishop Wulfred of Canterbury, in 824 and 825. A Kentish charter shows that Beornwulf still had authority in Kent on 27 March 826 – S1267, issued on that date, is said to be in the third year of Beornwulf's reign. Coins minted during Beornwulf's reign are very rare, with only around 25 known examples.

See also
Kings of Mercia family tree

References

External links
 

826 deaths
Mercian monarchs
Anglo-Saxon warriors
Anglo-Saxons killed in battle
9th-century English monarchs
Year of birth unknown